Juna Savar is a village in the Amreli district of Gujarat, India. The Shetrunji River helps this village a lot, but sometimes it floods the village during monsoons. Asiatic lions live near the village. Kanani, Zalavadiya, Laheri, Bagda, Makwana (Jinjariya), and Boghra the are main surnames of this village.

Overview
The River Sentruji, which flows south to north during the monsoon season, is the main attraction of the city.

Demographics
There is a major presence of people with the surnames Zalavadiya,Kanani, Ankoliya, Bagda, Jinjariya, and Laheri in Juna Savar.

Geography
Juna Savar is situated on southern Saurashtra plateau. It has a hilly terrain and the ground water table is very low. The water contains high level of TDS counts along with excess level of sodium and phosphate. The water extracted from the bore-wells is found to be very hot.

History and culture
There is a temple of Goddess "Chamunda Maa" in Juna Savar which is made by Vallabhbhai Mohanbhai Jinjariya. He was the first man of his village to bring diamond business in his village. He moved to Surat in his early life and then started doing diamond business there.

Education 
Juna Savar has an average literacy rate.

Villages in Amreli district